Francesco Rugeri (Cremona,  1628;  28 October 1698), also known as Ruger, Rugier, Rugeri, Ruggeri, Ruggieri, Ruggerius, was the first of an important family of luthiers, the Casa Rugeri in Cremona, Italy. His instruments are masterfully constructed. His violins are inspired by Nicolò Amati's "Grand Amati" pattern. Francesco was the first to develop a smaller cello design, which has become the standard for modern cello dimensions. Today, Rugeri's instruments are nearly as renowned as Nicolò Amati's instruments.

The Rugeri family is not to be confused with the Rogeri family of Brescia who were also noted luthiers following the tradition of Amati.

Apprenticeship 
He was perhaps the earliest apprentice of Nicolò Amati, another important luthier in Cremona Italy, although other sources call this association into question as there is no census record showing his presence in the Amati household. The lack of census records showing the Rugeri name may be explained by the possibility of Francesco not being an indoor apprentice, but one who lived and boarded at his own home while apprenticing. Antonio Stradivari's name never appears in the census records of the Amati household even though he was also a possible pupil of Nicolò Amati and may have lived and boarded with his own family.

W.E. Hill & Sons note that the "unmistakable" handiwork of Francesco Rugeri can be found, in certain of Nicolo Amati's works, and just like Antonio Stradivari and Andrea Guarneri, Francesco from time to time included the words "Alumnus Nicolai Amati" on his labels, further adding to the evidence of his apprenticeship. For example, there exists a violin labelled "Francescus Rugerius Alumnus Nicolai Amati fecit Cremonæ 1663".

Nicolò Amati was the godfather to one of Francesco's sons, Giacinto (born in 1658 and lived only a few months), indicating that the two families at least shared a close relationship and close collaboration would seem likely. Francesco later had another son whom he also named Giacinto, who was born in 1661.

Interestingly, there was a court case brought in 1685 by a violinist who sought relief from the Duke of Modena as a victim of fraud. In this case, the violinist and composer Tomaso Antonio Vitali, bought a violin purporting to be a creation of Nicolò Amati. Yet under the Amati label was the label of Francesco Rugeri. There was a price difference in those days of 3 to 1 on Amati vs. Rugeri violins, so this was a serious matter. However, this case may also indicate that Rugeri, who was working in the shadow of the great Cremona makers—Amati, Guarneri, and Stradivari—resorted to a desperate act to make a sale.

Some researchers believe there is a closer educational association between Antonio Stradivari and Francesco Rugeri than has previously been recognized. Despite the long-held belief that Antonio Stradivari was the pupil of Nicolò Amati, there are important discrepancies between their work. Some researchers believe early instruments by Stradivari bear a stronger resemblance to Francesco Rugeri's work than Amati's. Additionally, the use of a small dorsal pin or small hole, invariably used not just by Nicolò Amati but all of his recognized pupils—with the exception of Antonio Stradivari, adds further evidence that Stradivari may have learnt his craft apart from Amati. This pin or hole was fundamental in the graduation of the thickness of the plates and was obviously a technique passed on through generations of pupils of the Amati. This dorsal pin is also not found in any of the instruments of the Rugeri family, suggesting Antonio Stradivari may have actually learnt his craft from Francesco Rugeri, although both being influenced by Amati. W.E. Hill & Sons concede that they fail to find the hand of Stradivari in any of Nicolo Amati's work, although the unmistakable hands of Andrea Guarneri and Francesco Rugeri are evident.

Count Ignazio Alessandro Cozio di Salabue and other early violin connoisseurs such as the Mantegazza brothers seemed to confuse the families of the Rugeri working in Cremona with the family of Giovanni Battista Rogeri working in Brecia. These two separate families of violin makers both followed the Amati tradition of violin making however their work is distinctive from each other are not thought to be related. The Rugeri family included the words "il Per" or "detto il Per" in their labels. This nickname appears also in almost all of the religious and legal documents pertaining to the Rugeri family from 1669 onward and was probably meant to distinguish them from the many other Rugeri families in the region.

Career
Francesco lived and worked just outside of the walls of Cremona, Italy in the Parishes of San Bernardo at No. 7 Contrada Coltellai and later by 1687 in the Parish of San Sebastiano  In San Sebastiano he lived next to the convent of San Sigismondo, one of the finest buildings in Cremona.  His most productive period was during the 1670s–1680s during which time he was assisted by his 3 sons and closely followed the instruments of Nicolò Amati, sometimes even placing Amati labels in his instruments.  His success peaked after Nicolò Amati's decline and before the rise of the workshop of Antonio Stradivari. Francesco's violins were characterized by a high level of craftsmanship and a very slightly higher arch. After 1670, Francesco was ably assisted by 3 of his sons in his workshop.  The Rugeri tradition was carried on and developed by Francesco's son, Vincenzo Rugeri, who was the only of his sons to later have an independent successful career as a luthier.   Some instruments purported to be by Francesco are actually the work of Vincenzo.

Instruments created by Rugeri are highly desirable owing to their high level of craftsmanship and tone.

Francesco was buried in the Church of San Trinita.

Cello size pioneer 
Francesco Rugeri was the first to make an important contribution to cello making in the development of a smaller version of the cello that is now the standard. His cello is  smaller from the cellos made by other Cremonese luthiers of the same period, namely, Amati and Stradivari. Cellos made by other luthiers of the period are often quite massive and fairly unmanageable for modern players' usage unless severely cut down in size.

Casa Rugeri 
Francesco is the founder of the Rugeri family of violin makers. Francesco married Ippolito Ravasi in 1652 in the Church of San Bernardo. They had a total of 10 children (six sons and 4 daughters) although some died young.  Three of his six sons followed his footsteps in string instruments making. Interestingly, Francesco had two sons he named Giacinto—the first was born in 1658 and baptized Nov 19th 1658 with Nicolò Amati being the Godfather.  Unfortunately, Giacinto only lived a few months following his baptism.  The fact that Amati was his Godfather demonstrates that Rugeri and Amati at least shared a close relationship.  Francesco's son, Vincenzo, became the most important luthier of Francesco's sons and carried on the Rugeri tradition after Francesco's death.

Other luthiers in the family are:

Giovanni Battista Rugeri ( 2 July 1653;  14 Dec 1711) was the eldest son of Francesco Rugeri.  He married in 1677 and moved briefly to another Parish, however returned to San Bernardo to presumably continue work in Francesco's shop. Although a capable luthier, his independent work is extremely rare.  Hieronymus Amati II, son of Nicolò Amati, was a Godfather to one of Giovanni Battista's son's.
Giacinto Rugeri ( 15 May 1661;  2 June 1697) was the second son of Francesco Rugeri and was also a capable worker in his father's shop.  Like Giovanni Battista, his independent work is extremely rare.  Giacinto had a son, Antonio, who is recorded as a luthier, however his work is unknown.
Vincenzo Rugeri ( 30 September 1663;  4 May 1719) was the third, and most well known son of Francesco Rugeri. Vincenzo enjoyed considerable fortune as an independent violin maker and was possibly the finest craftsman of the family. His violins advanced upon the models of his father, retaining the Grand Amati form but adapting a flatter arch inspired by Stradivari. The overall quality of his instruments is exceptional and deserve to be ranked at least as high as those of his more famous father. Vincenzo's instruments, together with Francesco's, are the most sought after of the family.  Vincenzo was the first teacher of Carlo Bergonzi (luthier).
Carlo Rugeri ( 1666;  1713) He was Francesco's youngest son.  Although he inherited  all of Francesco's tools relating to the making of "violins, guitars, violoni and calascioni'" as indicated in Francesco's codicil, Carlo does not appear to have been involved significantly with the family's violin shop and may have pursued another vocation based upon the almost non-existent examples of his work.

References

Luthiers from Cremona
Year of birth uncertain
1698 deaths
17th-century Italian businesspeople
18th-century Italian businesspeople
1628 births